The Sanctum Sanctorum is a fictional building appearing in American comic books published by Marvel Comics, as the residence and headquarters of Doctor Strange. Created by Stan Lee and Steve Ditko, the building first appeared in Strange Tales #110 (July 1963). It is located at 177A Bleecker Street in New York City's Greenwich Village neighborhood. This is a reference to the address of an apartment once shared by writers Roy Thomas and Gary Friedrich.

The Sanctum Sanctorum has appeared in various media adaptations, including animated television series, video games, and in numerous media within the Marvel Cinematic Universe.

Publication history

The Sanctum Sanctorum first appeared with Doctor Strange in his debut in Strange Tales #110 (July 1963), drawn by Steve Ditko. The details of the building have varied by artist, with one reviewer noting, for example, of Marvel Premiere #3 (July 1972) that "[n]ot since the heady days of Ditko for instance, did the doctor's sanctum sanctorum appear in such scrumptious detail, laden it seemed, with the heavy odor of burning incense". In a comical turn in Strange Tales #147, a building inspector informs Strange that he has six months to get the Sanctum Sanctorum repainted and make other repairs, or the building will be condemned. It has been described as "an integral part of the Doctor Strange mythos".

Characterization

Location 

The Sanctum Sanctorum is a three-story townhouse located at 177A Bleecker Street. It is "in the heart of New York City's Greenwich Village." Contrary to fan theories that this address was meant to invoke 221B Baker Street, the fictional domicile of Sherlock Holmes, it was actually a reference to the address of an apartment shared in the 1960s by Roy Thomas and Gary Friedrich. In the comics, the building was said to have been built upon the site of pagan sacrifices, and before that Native American rituals, and is a focal point for supernatural energies. It was noted that as of 2016, the location could be found on Google Maps.

Architecture 
The building's depiction has varied over the years but some elements remain consistent. "The outside looks like a townhouse, while past a veil of magical force on the inside are various rooms with various mystical artifacts", as one source put it. There seems to be more space inside than there would seem to be from outside. Some corridors form labyrinths, and the arrangement of rooms seems to change by itself. The house holds many powerful magical items, some of which have an innocent appearance. Some are dangerous, such as a radio which is fatal to the touch. The basement contains storage, a furnace, and the laundry. The first floor contains living rooms, dining rooms, and the general library. The second floor holds living quarters for Strange, Wong, and any guests they may have. The Sanctum Sanctorum is specifically the third floor of the building, home to Strange's meditation room and occult library, where he keeps the Book of the Vishanti, and his repository of ancient artifacts and objects of magical power, such as the Orb of Agamotto.

The Sanctum consistently has a circular skylight with four swooping lines; this design has stayed with the building despite the window's destruction on many occasions. The design of the window is actually the Seal of the Vishanti; it protects the Sanctum from most supernatural invaders. It is also called the "Window of the Worlds," or the Anomaly Rue. Certain members of the New Avengers appear to acknowledge this. Chemistro, a super-villain member of the Hood's army, though possessing no such power to directly break that of the Vishanti's, was able to change the chemical composition of the wood that held the seal to break it. In one story Baron Mordo was able to transport the house to another dimension. The artistic directors of the Marvel Cinematic Universe film adaptation described it as a "turn-of-the-century empire—timeless, really—mixture of classical and neoclassical American architecture".

Residents 
Its main residents, apart from Strange, have been his lover/apprentice Clea, his manservant Wong, and the apprentice sorcerer Rintrah.

The Sanctum Sanctorum became the headquarters of the New Avengers for a time, having been magically disguised as an abandoned building designated as a future Starbucks cafe. The run-down disguise extends to the interior of the building as needed, undetectable by even the Extremis armor of Iron Man.

The building has also served as headquarters of the Defenders.

Defenses 
After constructing the house, Doctor Strange cast a permanent, intricate spell of mystical force to protect it. Despite this, it was seemingly destroyed in a siege by mystical forces, during the Midnight Sons storyline, while various heroes such as the Nightstalkers, Ghost Rider, and Johnny Blaze were hiding inside.

During the World War Hulk storyline, the Sanctum was invaded by the forces of the alien Warbound, its defensive enchantments and illusions shattered by Hiroim.

After the use of unacceptable dark magics in the fight against the Hulk, the Sanctum is invaded by the Hood's army, who are ultimately defeated amid much damage to the building. Doctor Strange is forced to retreat when the battle allows the government-sanctioned Mighty Avengers to take over the Sanctum. Brother Voodoo is called in to neutralize the remnants of the defensive magics.

On at least one occasion, Doctor Strange has destroyed the defenses of the Sanctum to avoid their exploitation by a foe.

Reception

Accolades 

 In 2019, CBR.com ranked the Sanctum Sanctorum 4th in their "10 Most Iconic Superhero Hideouts In Marvel Comics" list.
 In 2020, CBR.com ranked the Sanctum Sanctorum 9th in their "Avengers 10 Best Headquarters" list.

Other versions

Marvel Zombies
In the "Marvel Zombies" continuity, a handful of heroes seek help and information at the Sanctum. Wong is slain there by a zombified Doctor Druid, who is then killed by Ash Williams. Some of the semi-living books in the house provide vital assistance in the zombie-resistance effort.

Ultimate Marvel
In the "Ultimate Marvel" continuity, a taxi propelled by great force pierces the defense of the house. The top-floor window sigil is shattered, along with the prison that holds monsters. These are let loose, followed by Dormammu. The fight that follows destroys the Sanctum and kills Strange.

In other media

Television
 The Sanctum Sanctorum appears in The Super Hero Squad Show.
 The Sanctum Sanctorum appears in Ultimate Spider-Man.
 The Sanctum Sanctorum appears in Avengers Assemble.
 The Sanctum Sanctorum appears in the Hulk and the Agents of S.M.A.S.H. episode "Stranger in a Strange Land."

Film
 The Sanctum Sanctorum appears in Dr. Strange.
 The Sanctum Sanctorum appears in Doctor Strange: The Sorcerer Supreme.
 The Sanctum Sanctorum appears in Hulk: Where Monsters Dwell.

Marvel Cinematic Universe
The Sanctum Sanctorum appears in media set in the Marvel Cinematic Universe.
 As depicted in the film Doctor Strange (2016), the Masters of the Mystic Arts utilize three Sanctums in New York, London, and Hong Kong to defend Earth against interdimensional threats via a magical barrier. Kaecilius attempts to destroy the Sanctums so Dormammu can consume Earth, but he and his followers are defeated by Doctor Strange, who becomes the master of the New York Sanctum following the death of its previous master, Daniel Drumm, and takes up residence there. The artistic directors of the film recognized the Sanctum Sanctorum itself as "a big character in the film", leading them to design "a building with a distinct, individualized personality".
 The New York Sanctum appears in the film Thor: Ragnarok (2017). Strange transports Thor to the Sanctum to help him and Loki find their father, Odin. 
 The New York Sanctum appears in the film Avengers: Infinity War (2018). Bruce Banner crashes into the Sanctum and warns Strange and Wong of Thanos's threat. Strange summons Tony Stark to the Sanctum to inform him of Thanos and the Infinity Stones. However, Strange is kidnapped by Ebony Maw, forcing Stark to pursue him while Wong becomes the acting master of the Sanctum.
 An alternate timeline version of the New York Sanctum appears in the film Avengers: Endgame (2019), in which Banner time-travels to 2012 to recover the Time Stone, and encounters the Ancient One outside the Sanctum.
 A damaged, unidentified Sanctum makes a brief appearance in the Disney+ series Loki episode "Journey into Mystery" as part of the Void.
 The New York Sanctum appears in the film Spider-Man: No Way Home (2021). Peter Parker visits the location to seek help from Strange in erasing the world's knowledge that he is Spider-Man, and Strange performs a spell to that effect in the Sanctum. When the spell goes awry, causing alternate reality-displaced supervillains to enter their universe, Strange holds the villains at the Sanctum, intending to keep them there until he is eventually able to return them.
 The New York Sanctum appears in the film Doctor Strange in the Multiverse of Madness (2022). Additionally,  two alternate universe versions of the Sanctum appear, with one being mastered by Mordo and another that houses the Darkhold-corrupted "Sinister Strange".

Video games
 The Sanctum Sanctorum appears in Marvel: Ultimate Alliance.
 The Sanctum Sanctorum appears as a landmark in The Incredible Hulk.
 The Sanctum Sanctorum appears as a landmark in Ultimate Spider-Man.
 The Sanctum Sanctorum appears in Lego Marvel Super Heroes and Lego Marvel Super Heroes 2.
 The Sanctum Sanctorum appears as a landmark in Marvel's Spider-Man and Spider-Man: Miles Morales.
 The Sanctum Sanctorum appears in Marvel Snap.
 The Sanctum Sanctorum appears in Marvel's Midnight Suns.

Miscellaneous 
The Sanctum Sanctorum appears in "The Sanctum Sanctorum Showdown" and "Spider-Man at the Sanctum Workshop" Lego sets.

References

Doctor Strange
Fictional buildings and structures originating in comic books
Marvel Comics locations